Stanislav Denisov (born 23 December 1993) is a Russian taekwondo practitioner. In 2015, he won the silver medal in the men's finweight event at the 2015 World Taekwondo Championships held in Chelyabinsk, Russia.

References

1993 births
Living people
Russian male taekwondo practitioners
World Taekwondo Championships medalists
European Taekwondo Championships medalists
21st-century Russian people